Yakkala is a village located between Nittambuwa and Kadawatha on the A1 Highway (Colombo-Kandy Road). It forms part of Gampaha Municipal Council and located in the Gampaha District, Western Province.

Yakkala is famous for the long-standing Ayurveda medicine family of Wickramaarachchi. Wickramaarachchi Ayurveda Institute of University of Kelaniya is also situated in Yakkala.

Main attractions around Yakkala include ancient Buddhist cave temples of Warana, Pilikuththuwa, Uruwala and Maligathenna.

Schools
 Sri Chandrajothi M.V. Yakkala
 Anura M.V. Yakkala

References

Populated places in Western Province, Sri Lanka
Grama Niladhari divisions of Sri Lanka